The Abbey Mill was a medieval tidal watermill in West Ham, London, dating back to at least the 12th century. It was sited on Channelsea Island in the Channelsea River in the London Borough of Newham. It was one of the eight watermills on the River Lea recorded in the Domesday Book.

The area nearby the site of the original Abbey Mill is now known as Abbey Mills. There are several pumping stations located there, including the original Abbey Mills Pumping Station.

References 

Watermills in London
Watermills mentioned in the Domesday Book